Adelaide Meyer (June 4, 1906 – June 1, 1944) was an American gymnast. She competed in the women's artistic team all-around event at the 1936 Summer Olympics.

References

1906 births
1944 deaths
American female artistic gymnasts
Olympic gymnasts of the United States
Gymnasts at the 1936 Summer Olympics
Sportspeople from Brooklyn
20th-century American women